The Bucerdea is a left tributary of the river Ighiu in Romania. It flows into the Ighiu in Șard.

References
 

Rivers of Romania
Rivers of Alba County